"Magic" is a song by American hip hop recording artist B.o.B, released on June 7, 2010 as the fifth single from his debut studio album B.o.B Presents: The Adventures of Bobby Ray (2010). The track features Weezer's lead singer Rivers Cuomo, singing the chorus. It was written by both artists, alongside the song's producer Dr. Luke. In the UK, the track made Radio 1's B-Playlist.

Composition
"Magic", a hip hop song, is written in the key of B major with a tempo of 82 beats per minute in common time.  The song follows a chord progression of B5–E5–G5–F5, and the vocals in the song span from D3 to F4.

Reception
Despite mixed reviews, the song progressed up and down the Billboard Hot 100 chart, reaching number 10 at its peak. Billboard gave it a positive review, saying, "The song's strongest force is an infectious, throbbing synth-guitar hook from Dr. Luke, who seamlessly fuses B.o.B's verses with a chorus by Weezer frontman Rivers Cuomo that demands a singalong. The result is stellar." The reviewer at TinyMixtapes.com said that "'Magic' is magnificently, triumphantly corny, enough to give Steve Miller and that guy from The Outfield a run for their money. 'Magic' isn't good by any stretch of the imagination, but it is goofily enjoyable."

In his album review for Spin, Kenny Herzog wrote,  "The Adventures of Bobby Ray is a hip-hop Scary Movie, tossing off references (Vampire Weekend sample, Rivers Cuomo cameo) while struggling to establish a distinctive identity." Pitchfork questioned "the appearance by Weezer's Rivers Cuomo, whose creepily blank vocals on 'Magic' sound like the engineer has a gun to his head". The Guardians Paul MacInnes wrote that "all the Chris Martinesque piano lines and calibrated guest appearances – from Weezer's River Cuomo to Janelle Monáe – can't obscure an absence of soul throughout."

Music video

The music video was released on MTV at midnight on September 3, 2010 The video features B.o.B trying to wake himself up from a dream. He was also performing with Rivers Cuomo in the video on a stage at a wild party. In addition, Paul Iacono from the MTV show The Hard Times of RJ Berger is featured dancing on stage. The video was directed by Sanaa Hamri.

Track listing
 "Magic" - 3:16
 "Mellow Fellow" - 2:58

Charts and certifications

Weekly charts

Year-end charts

Certifications

In other media
 The Treblemakers, an all-male a cappella group in Pitch Perfect, sang the song in their finale performance.
 Becky G recorded a new version of the song for The Smurfs 2 soundtrack called "Magik 2.0", featuring singer Austin Mahone. It was produced by A.C.

References

2010 singles
2010 songs
B.o.B songs
Atlantic Records singles
Grand Hustle Records singles
Rivers Cuomo songs
Song recordings produced by Dr. Luke
Songs written by B.o.B
Songs written by Dr. Luke
Songs written by Rivers Cuomo
Pop-rap songs